Habib Frédéric Beye (born 19 October 1977) is a former professional footballer who played as a right-back. He is the manager of Championnat National club Red Star. Born in France, he represented the Senegal national team.

He is also a pundit on Canal+ in France.

Early life
Beye was born in Suresnes, Hauts-de-Seine.

Club career

Paris Saint-Germain
Beye joined Paris Saint-Germain in 1997, though he progressed no further than the reserve side, playing in the national fifth division. He transferred at the end of the season to RC Strasbourg in 1998 for an undisclosed amount.

Strasbourg
Following his summer move to RC Strasbourg in 1998, Beye made his league debut on 8 August 1998 in a home 0–0 draw against Lyon, and played a total of 23 times in his first season at the club. He missed just five league matches in the following season, and netted for the first time on 2 October 1999 in a 2–2 home draw with Bordeaux. He was a member of the RC Strasbourg side that won the 2001 French Cup, eventually defeating third division Amiens SC in a penalty shoot-out, which helped his team achieve UEFA Cup qualification in the following season. He appeared a total of 134 times in the league for Strasbourg, scoring 8 goals, before moving to Marseille in 2003, a move which surprised many as he was a firm favourite at Strasbourg and had established himself as a key player there.

Marseille
Beye signed for Marseille in the summer of 2003 for a reported €2.5million, by then manager Alain Perrin. In his opening season with the club, he took part in both UEFA Champions League and UEFA Cup football. He was a key player for the Marseille side that reached the 2004 UEFA Cup Final, a run which involved him putting in a star performance as a central defender against (his now former team) Newcastle United, where he was particularly effective against Newcastle's talisman striker Alan Shearer. He ended up on the losing side as Marseille lost the final to Valencia 2–0. He was also a beaten finalist in the 2006 French Cup against former club Paris Saint-Germain, a match which his team lost 2–1, and again in 2007 when his Marseille team lost on penalties to FC Sochaux. His time with Marseille was a successful one where he established himself as one of the most accomplished defenders in France's top tier and was voted the fans’ Player of the Year in 2006. He was captain of the club for two years prior to his move to Newcastle United.

Newcastle United

Beye signed for Newcastle United for a fee of £2million (€3million) on 31 August 2007, during the closing minutes of the summer transfer window. He signed a three-year contract, with then Newcastle manager Sam Allardyce declaring that he was very pleased with the transfer. Allardyce said in a later interview on the club's website that he felt he acquired Beye for a "bargain" price and that him and his international colleague who also signed with him, Abdoulaye Faye would be excellent signings for Newcastle.

He made his Newcastle debut on 17 September 2007, as a substitute in Newcastle's 1–0 defeat at Derby County. He then made his full debut at home to West Ham United, a display which impressed many Newcastle fans. He had been a fixture in the first team, and scored his only Premier League goal for Newcastle in the 2–1 win against Birmingham City on 8 December, with a near-post header in second-half injury time.

His ability to defend well and provide a good outlet going forward have enamored him to the Newcastle faithful and a number of terrace songs became established, starting with a chant of his name to the tune of Happy Days first heard at Fulham.

On 22 May 2008, Beye was named Newcastle player of the season based on fan votes to a poll organised by the Evening Chronicle, he was then named the official Newcastle player of the season on 23 May 2008, as well as being named the Newcastle United Disabled Supporters Association Player of the Season on 22 August.

After missing the start of the 2008–09 season from injury, Beye started against Manchester City on 20 October 2008. He was sent off after only 12 minutes for a challenge on Robinho, the first red card of his Newcastle career. Newcastle appealed the red card and on 23 October the claim of wrongful dismissal was upheld. After Newcastle were relegated from the Premier League at the conclusion of the 2008–09 season, an article on the club's official website stated Beye's intention to remain at the club to help get them back into the Premier League.

However, the continuing problems behind the scenes at Newcastle would lead to Beye stating that he would have to leave the club in order to save his career.

Aston Villa
Despite Hull City chairman Paul Duffen revealing that the Tigers had agreed a fee with Newcastle United to sign Beye on 6 August 2009, it was announced the following day that Beye had signed for Aston Villa. Beye was substituted late into his Villa debut on the opening day of the 2009–10 season, a 2–0 defeat by Wigan Athletic. He was sent off near the end of his third game for Villa in an away tie against West Ham United. Beye found it hard to break into the Villa first team with the likes of Carlos Cuéllar and Luke Young ahead of him in the pecking order and often found himself restricted to bench appearances. In February 2012, it was announced that Beye's contract had been cancelled by mutual consent.

Doncaster Rovers
After making just nine league appearances for Aston Villa since the summer of 2009 and being surplus to requirements, Beye signed on loan for Doncaster Rovers in November 2011, in a hope to revive his career after a turbulent two years spell in Aston Villa. After his first 3 games for the club, he received big praise from Rovers fans and Rovers manager Dean Saunders following some impressive displays in the centre of defence. He helped Doncaster to two home clean sheets in a row, whilst winning the sponsors man of the match award in both games (against Watford and Southampton) and has been a regular starter in the team. On 22 January 2012, Beye was sent off during a match against Bristol City in a Championship game which ended in a 2–1 defeat, resulting in a three-match ban. This also turned out to be his last game for Doncaster as he was released by Aston Villa on 2 February.

Following his release, Beye signed an 18-month deal to permanently join Rovers on 13 February 2012. After completing his domestic three-game ban, he played his first game after signing permanently against Peterborough United in a 1–1 draw on 25 February 2012. He scored his first goal for the club against fellow relegation candidates Portsmouth on 14 April. At the same time, he was sent off for the second time this season for a foul on Portsmouth's Dave Kitson, which conceded a penalty for the opposing side. That result ended 4–3 in favour of Portsmouth and Birmingham City's 2–2 draw against Bristol City confirmed Doncaster's relegation to the League One for the upcoming 2012–13 season. He returned from suspension on 28 April, and scored a late consolation goal for Doncaster Rovers, in a 3–2 defeat by Ipswich Town on the final day of the season. Beye retired from football after his contract ended.

International career
Beye played in the Senegal national squad from 2001 to 2008, winning 35 caps and scoring one goal. He made substitute appearances in Senegal's matches in the 2002 FIFA World Cup, against Denmark, Uruguay and Sweden. He retired from international football in an effort to concentrate on his club career following a shambolic Africa Cup of Nations by Senegal in 2008, though he was then called up for a friendly against Libya on 20 August 2008, meaning that he had either not retired or chosen to come out of it.

Personal life
Beye is a Muslim.

Honours
Strasbourg
Coupe de France: 2000–01

Marseille
UEFA Intertoto Cup: 2005
Coupe de France runner-up: 2005–06, 2006–07
UEFA Cup runner-up: 2003–04

Aston Villa
Football League Cup runner-up: 2009–10

Individual
Newcastle United Player of the Year: 2007–08

References

External links

1977 births
Living people
Sportspeople from Suresnes
Senegalese footballers
Senegal international footballers
Senegalese football managers
French footballers
French football managers
French sportspeople of Senegalese descent
Citizens of Senegal through descent
Association football defenders
Paris Saint-Germain F.C. players
RC Strasbourg Alsace players
Olympique de Marseille players
Newcastle United F.C. players
Aston Villa F.C. players
Doncaster Rovers F.C. players
Ligue 1 players
Premier League players
English Football League players
2002 African Cup of Nations players
2002 FIFA World Cup players
2004 African Cup of Nations players
2006 Africa Cup of Nations players
2008 Africa Cup of Nations players
French expatriate footballers
Senegalese expatriate footballers
Expatriate footballers in England
French expatriate sportspeople in England
Senegalese expatriate sportspeople in England
Red Star F.C. managers
French Muslims
Senegalese Muslims
Footballers from Hauts-de-Seine